Pankaj Jalote was the Director of Indraprastha Institute of Information Technology. 
Jalote is a Fellow of the IEEE and INAE.

Before joining IIIT Delhi, he worked as the Microsoft Chair Professor at the Department of Computer Science and Engineering at IIT Delhi. Jalote has also taught at the Department of Computer Science at IIT Kanpur and University of Maryland.

Education
Prof Jalote completed his PhD from University of Illinois at Urbana-Champaign in 1985, M.S. from Pennsylvania State University in 1982 and BTech from IIT Kanpur in 1980.

Articles and books published
Prof Jalote has published numerous papers and articles in leading journals and newspapers.

He has authored following books:
 Building Research Universities in India, SAGE Publishing
 Software Project Management in Practice, Addison Wesley
 CMM in Practice: Processes for executing software projects at Infosys, Addison Wesley
 An Integrated Approach to Software Engineering, Springer, New York
 Fault Tolerance in Distributed Systems, Prentice Hall
 Software Engineering: A Precise Approach, Wesley

References

Academic staff of IIT Delhi
Academic staff of IIT Kanpur
Living people
Year of birth missing (living people)